Grits is a Christian hip hop group from Nashville, Tennessee. Their name is an acronym, which stands for "Grammatical Revolution In the Spirit". GRITS is made up of Stacey "Coffee" Jones and Teron "Bonafide" Carter, both of whom were DC Talk dancers.

Their song "Ooh Ahh" has appeared on the MTV show My Super Sweet 16. It is also used as the theme song of The Buried Life and on the soundtracks to The Fast and the Furious: Tokyo Drift and Big Momma's House 2. Their song "Tennessee Bwoys" was used on the popular television show Pimp My Ride. They were also involved in !Hero The Rock Opera. They recorded a remix of professional wrestler A.J. Styles' entrance music and performed it on the May 28, 2009, episode of TNA Impact!.

Background
The Christian hip hop duo began as dancers for DC Talk and then formed the group in 1995, with Teron David "Bonafide" Carter, (born January 17, 1971) and Stacy Bernhard "Coffee" Jones, (born September 8, 1972), forming the group together in Nashville, Tennessee. GRITS is an acronym with a meaning of "Grammatical Revolution in the Spirit". They both credited the inspiration for their rapping to hearing DC Talk, when the two first encountered each other in 1990. This is the reason the duo signed with Gotee Records, a label founded by DC Talk member, tobyMac, where they were one of his first signees. They are also considered to be one of the pioneering groups in the Christian hip hop movement, while they eventually started their own record label, Revolution Art, in 2007, where it was first known as 5E Entertainment. They explained it was like graduating from school by leaving Gotee Records, and founding their own label.

Style
Mainly, their style is alternative hip hop and Southern rap, while several of their songs have pop influences, thus an occasional pop-rap sound, and their song "We Don't Play" has a Jamaican influence complete with steel drums. They were one of the first acts signed to Gotee Records, and have released seven albums with Gotee, with an eighth one released by Gotee and AudioGoat. In 2014, Gotee Records announced that the GRITS song "Ooh Ahh" was RIAA Digital Gold Certified, having surpassed 500,000 downloads.  They have appeared at Cornerstone Festival and Rock the Universe. In addition their song "Bobbin Bouncin'" was added to the track list in the video-game Project Gotham Racing 4.

Discography

Studio albums

EPs

Remix albums

Singles

As lead artist

Other songs
 With or Without You - In The Name Of Love: Artists United For Africa
Wedding Celebration - !Hero

Vinyl
The Art of Translation (Single) (2002)
They All Fall Down (Redneck Remix) (Single) (2002)
They Al Fall Down (Ruff Nation Remix) (Single) (2002)
Ima Showem (Single) (1999)
Instrumentals 1 (1999)
Instrumentals 2 (1999)
Instrumentals 3 (1999)
They All Fall Down (Original) (Single) (1999)
Factors of the Seven (song) (1997)

Guest Artists

Manchild - "We Don't Play"
Jennifer Knapp- "Believe" (Dove Award winning Rap/Hip Hop song of the year)
TobyMac- "Ooh Ahh"; "Say Goodbye"; "Don't Bring Me Down"; "Hey Now"
Stefan the Scientist- "Hittin Curves"
Pettidee- "I Be"
Jason Eskridge- "I Try"
Antonio Phelon- "Love Child"
Lisa Kimmey- "It Takes Love"; "Shawty"; "Time To Pray"
Iz- "Jay Mumbles Mega Mix" "Dusk Till Dawn"
Pigeon John - "Open Bar"; "You Said"; "Beautiful Morning"
Canibus - "Ambitions"
KJ52 - "Integrity"
Mac Powell - "Fly Away"
Michael Tait - "Fly Away (Remix)"
Verbs - "U.S. Open"; "Hopes and Dreams"; "Gospel Rap; Parables"; "Strugglin'"; "C2K"; "Video Girl"; "Different Drum"
Dan Haseltine - "Sky May Fall"
Jade Harrell-"Turn it Up"; "Say Goodbye"; "Neverland"
Brittany Waddell (Better known as Britt Nicole) "Rainy Days" "Soul Cry" "Right Back" "Dusk Till Dawn"

Awards

GMA Dove Awards

They have received several Gospel Music Association Dove Awards throughout their career. Their first award was for a song about plagiarism ("Plagiarism" from their album Factors of the Seven). For this, they received the best "Rap/Hip Hop Song" award. The next year they took the same award for "They All Fall Down", from Grammatical Revolution. In 2003 The Art Of Translation won the award for "Rap/Hip Hop Album", and the following year their song "Believe" from the same album took "Rap/Hip Hop Song". They also shared in the "Special Event Album" that year, for their contribution to !Hero The Rock Opera.

Other Awards

They were nominated for Rap/Hip Hop Performer of the Year at the 2009 Visionary Awards Show (held at the First Baptist Church in Frisco, Texas). However, instead, the award went to the Christian rap duo "Word of Mouth"

References

External links
GRITS on MySpace

American hip hop groups
Alternative hip hop groups
Christian hip hop groups
Southern hip hop groups
Musical groups from Nashville, Tennessee
American Christian musical groups
Hip hop activists
Hip hop duos
Musical groups established in 1995
Gotee Records artists